César Nicolás Paredes Avellaneda (born 5 September 1992) is a Colombian cyclist, who currently rides for UCI Continental team .

Major results
2016
 2nd Overall Vuelta a Chiriquí
 9th Overall Vuelta a Costa Rica
2017
 1st  Overall Vuelta Ciclista de Chile
2018
 1st  Overall Vuelta Michoacán
2019
 7th Overall Vuelta a San Juan
2020
 8th Overall Vuelta a San Juan
2023
 6th Overall Vuelta a San Juan

References

External links

1992 births
Living people
Colombian male cyclists
Sportspeople from Bogotá